The 2011 Rally America season was the seventh season of Rally America. The season consisted of 6 rallies and began on January 29, with the Sno*Drift National Rally in Michigan. It was the first rally won by a Super Production Car in Rally America's history. At the end of the season Rally Car sold the rights to Rally American to investors who changed the series name back to Rally America.

On May 1, 2011, Rally America had their first fatal accident since the takeover from SCCA driver Matthew Marker went off the course, slid down an embankment and hit a tree.

Schedule

Major entries

Open
Only the top 10 competitors are listed.

Super Production
Only the top 5 competitors are listed.

2 Wheel Drive
Only the top 5 competitors are listed.

References

External links
Rally America
Rally America Videos
Old Rally Results

Rally America seasons
Rally America
America